Antennaria pulchella is a North American species of flowering plants in the family Asteraceae known by the common names Sierra pussytoes and beautiful pussytoes. It is native primarily to high elevations in the Sierra Nevada from Nevada County to Tulare County, where it is a plant of the alpine climate. Additional populations occur on Lassen Peak in Lassen County, and also in Washoe County, Nevada.

Description
Antennaria pulchella is a small, mat-forming perennial herb growing a patch of woolly grayish leaves dotted with purplish glands. It spreads via a tangled network of stolons. The species is dioecious, with male and female plants producing flower heads of slightly different morphologies. The fruit is an achene up to half a centimeter long, most of which is a long, soft pappus.

References

External links
Jepson Manual Treatment - Antennaria pulchella
United States Department of Agriculture Plants Profile; Antennaria pulchella
Calphotos Photos gallery, University of California

pulchella
Alpine flora
Flora of the Sierra Nevada (United States)
Flora of California
Flora of Nevada
Plants described in 1911